Santiago González was the defending champion, but chose not to compete.
Bobby Reynolds defeated Andre Begemann 6–3, 6–3 to claim the title.

Seeds

Draw

Finals

Top half

Bottom half

References
Main Draw
Qualifying Singles

Torneo Internacional AGT - Singles
2011 Singles